Sean Robert Hennesy is a guitarist for the bands Candlebox, Royal Bliss, and The Gracious Few. He has previously played for the bands The Hiwatts and The Kings Royal.

History
Hennesy joined a reunited Candlebox in 2006 on rhythm guitar. He joined The Gracious Few on lead guitar after Live guitarist Chad Taylor claimed that he did not want to play solos and lead singer Kevin Martin suggested that his Candlebox bandmate would be able to do the job. In July 2014 he joined Royal Bliss as the second guitarist. In 2015, he left the band shortly after lead guitarist Peter Klett and drummer Scott Mercado left to focus on solo projects.

In a 2010 interview, Hennesy described his style of guitar playing as, "A high-cut karate sound that cuts through," which he felt would be well suited to accompany Taylor's "Big, fat, manly beast" guitar sound."

On March 12, 2012, Hennesy played with three of his Gracious Few bandmates in Live when they unveiled Chris Shinn as their new lead singer at a concert in York, Pennsylvania.

Discography

With The Gracious Few
 The Gracious Few (2010)

With Candlebox
 Love Stories & Other Musings (2012)

References

External links
The Gracious Few, official website
Candlebox, official website
The Kings Royal, official website
Kevin Martin and the Hiwatts, official website

Candlebox members
The Gracious Few members
Living people
Year of birth missing (living people)